Saskatchewan is the sixth-most populous province in Canada with 1,132,505 residents as of 2021 and is the fifth-largest in land area at . These 774 municipalities are local government "creatures of provincial jurisdiction" with natural persons power. One of the key purposes of Saskatchewan's municipalities are "to provide services, facilities and other things that, in the opinion of council, are necessary or desirable for all or a part of the municipality". Other purposes are to: "provide good government"; "develop and maintain a safe and viable community"; "foster economic, social and environmental well-being" and "provide wise stewardship of public assets."

The Government of Saskatchewan's Ministry of Municipal Relations recognizes three general types of municipalities and seven sub-types – urban municipalities (cities, towns, villages and resort villages), rural municipalities and northern municipalities (northern towns, northern villages and northern hamlets). Cities are formed under the provincial authority of The Cities Act, which was enacted in 2002. Towns, villages, resort villages and rural municipalities are formed under the authority of The Municipalities Act, enacted in 2005. The three sub-types of northern municipalities are formed under the authority of The Northern Municipalities Act, enacted in 2010. As provincial laws, these three acts were passed by the Legislative Assembly of Saskatchewan with royal assent granted by the Lieutenant Governor.

Of Saskatchewan's 774 municipalities, 454 of them are urban municipalities (16 cities, 147 towns, 250 villages and 41 resort villages), 296 are rural municipalities and 24 are northern municipalities (2 northern towns, 11 northern villages and 11 northern hamlets). The Cities Act, The Municipalities Act and The Northern Municipalities Act stipulate governance of these municipalities. Saskatchewan's Ministry of Municipal Relations is responsible for providing provincial programs and services to municipalities.

The resort villages of Krydor and Waldron are tied as Saskatchewan's smallest municipalities by population with 15 people each.

Urban municipalities 

As of 2020, Saskatchewan has 454 urban municipalities, which includes the sub-types of cities, towns, villages and resort villages.

Cities 

A city can be created from a town by Saskatchewan's Minister of Municipal Relations by ministerial order via section 39 of The Cities Act if it has a population of 5,000 or more and the change in status is requested by the town council. A city does not automatically revert to town status if the population drops below 5,000; this only occurs if the city council requests it, the majority of electors vote to revert to town status, or the minister is of the opinion that the reversion to town status is in the public interest. Melville retains its city status despite dropping below the 5,000 population threshold in the 1990s.

Saskatchewan has 16 cities including Lloydminster, which traverses the provincial border with Alberta. Unlike Lloydminster, Flin Flon, which traverses the provincial border with Manitoba, is not officially recognized as a city. Saskatchewan's 16 cities had a cumulative population of 689,475 in the 2021 Census. Saskatchewan's largest and smallest cities are Saskatoon and Melville with populations of 266,141 and 4,493.

Towns 

A town can be created from a village or resort village by Saskatchewan's Minister of Municipal Relations by ministerial order via section 52 of The Municipalities Act if it has a population of 500 or more. Upon reaching a population of 5,000, a town's council may request the minister to change its status to a city in accordance with section 39 of The Cities Act. Should a town's population decline to less than 500, its council may request its status be reverted to village or resort village status.

Saskatchewan has 147 towns that had a cumulative population of 145,995 in the 2021 Census. Saskatchewan's largest and smallest towns are Nipawin and Fleming with populations of 4,570 and 70.

Villages 

A village can be created from an organized hamlet by Saskatchewan's Minister of Municipal Relations by ministerial order via section 51 of The Municipalities Act if it meets four requirements. It must have:
been an organized hamlet for three or more years;
a population of 300 or more;
150 or more dwellings or businesses; and
a taxable assessment of at least $30 million.

Upon reaching a population of 500, a village's council may request the minister to change its status to a town in accordance with section 52 of The Municipalities Act.

Saskatchewan has 250 villages that had a cumulative population of 40,447 in the 2021 Census. Saskatchewan's largest village is Caronport with a population of 1,033, while Krydor,  and Waldron are all tied as the province's smallest villages with populations of 15 each.

Resort villages 

Like a village, a resort village can be created from an organized hamlet by Saskatchewan's Minister of Municipal Relations by ministerial order via section 51 of The Municipalities Act if it has:

been an organized hamlet for three or more years; 
can demonstrate with a municipal census of the organized hamlet a permanent and seasonal population of 300 if the most recent national census shows a population of at least 100; 
150 or more dwellings or businesses; 
a taxable assessment of at least $35 million;
and is predominantly of a resort nature

Upon reaching a population of 500, a resort village's council may request the minister to change its status to a town in accordance with section 52 of The Municipalities Act.

Saskatchewan has 41 resort villages that had a cumulative population of 6,578 in the 2021 Census. Saskatchewan's largest resort village by population is Candle Lake with 1,160 inhabitants while the smallest is Sunset Cove with a population of 21.

List of urban municipalities

Rural municipalities 

A rural municipality (RM) can be created by Saskatchewan's Minister of Municipal Relations by ministerial order via section 49 of The Municipalities Act. Saskatchewan has 296 rural municipalities, which are located in the central and southern portions of the province. The largest and smallest rural municipalities by population are the RM of Corman Park No. 344 and the RM of Glen McPherson No. 46 with 8,909 and 76.

Northern municipalities 

Saskatchewan has 24 northern municipalities, which includes the sub-types of northern towns, northern villages and northern hamlets, that are located within the Northern Saskatchewan Administration District (NSAD). Administration of northern towns, northern villages and northern hamlets is regulated by The Northern Municipalities Act. Under this act:
a northern town may be formed from a northern village if it has a permanent resident population of at least 500;
a northern village may be formed from a northern hamlet if it has a permanent resident population of at least 100 and contains at least 50 separate dwelling units or business premises; and
a northern hamlet may be formed from an unincorporated northern settlement if it has a permanent population of at least 50 and contains at least 25 separate dwelling units or business premises.

Saskatchewan has 2 northern towns, 11 northern villages and 11 northern hamlets. The largest and smallest northern municipalities by population are La Ronge (a northern town) and Michel Village (a northern hamlet) with 2,521 and 37.

See also 

List of census agglomerations in Saskatchewan
List of communities in Saskatchewan
List of designated places in Saskatchewan
List of ghost towns in Saskatchewan
List of hamlets in Saskatchewan
List of Indian reserves in Saskatchewan
List of population centres in Saskatchewan

Notes

References

External links 
Government of Saskatchewan – Ministry of Government Relations

Municipalities